Symphonic black metal is a subgenre of black metal that emerged in the 1990s and incorporates symphonic and orchestral elements. Notable symphonic black metal bands include Cradle Of Filth, Dimmu Borgir, Emperor, and Carach Angren.

History 
The first extreme metal bands incorporating orchestral elements into their music were Bulldozer on their album Neurodeliri (1988), Master's Hammer on Ritual (1991) and The Jilemnice Occultist (1993) and Sigh on their debut Scorn Defeat (1993).

The style on Emperor's In the Nightside Eclipse (1994) had a pioneering influence though and was the main inspiration for many keyboard-based black metal bands following after. Troll's Drep de kristne (1995) and Arcturus' Aspera Hiems Symfonia (1996) are other notable early works of symphonic black metal, before the genre was commercialised by the international success of bands like Dimmu Borgir and Bal Sagoth.

Characteristics 
Symphonic black metal is a style of black metal that incorporates symphonic and orchestral elements. This may include the usage of keyboards to conjure up "pseudo-orchestral" soundscapes with default presets (e.g. strings, choirs, piano, organs, and pads), or full orchestral arrangements. Bands may feature solo instruments such as violins in addition to keyboards and/or orchestral arrangements. Vocals can be "clean" or operatic in style, and song structures are more defined or are inspired by symphonies, and follow a typical riff-based approach. Many of the characteristics of traditional black metal are retained, such as shrieks, fast tempos, high treble and tremolo-picked electric guitars. The overall sound and themes can be considered wider than traditional black metal, many groups of symphonic black metal use themes such as vampirism (Theatres des Vampires, Cradle of Filth), occultism and the paranormal (Carach Angren). Political themes are more neglected by them as in other black metal subgenres.

See also 

 List of symphonic black metal bands

References

 
Black metal subgenres
British rock music genres
Heavy metal genres
Norwegian styles of music